Seed balls, also known as earth balls or ,  consist of seeds rolled within a ball of clay and other matter to assist germination. They are then thrown into vacant lots and over fences as a form of 'guerilla gardening'. Matter such as humus and compost are often placed around the seeds to provide microbial inoculants. Cotton-fibres or liquefied paper are sometimes added to further protect the clay ball in particularly harsh habitats. An ancient technique, it was re-discovered by Japanese natural farming pioneer Masanobu Fukuoka.

Development of technique

The technique for creating seed balls was rediscovered by Japanese natural farming pioneer Masanobu Fukuoka. The technique was also used, for instance, in ancient Egypt to repair farms after the annual spring flooding of the Nile. In modern times, during the period of the Second World War, this Japanese government plant scientist working in a government lab, Fukuoka, who lived on the mountainous island of Shikoku, wanted to find a technique that would increase food production without taking away from the land already allocated for traditional rice production which thrived in the volcanic rich soils of Japan.

Construction

To make a seed ball, generally about five measures of red clay by volume are combined with one measure of seeds. The balls are formed between 10 mm and 80 mm (about " to 3") in diameter. After the seed balls have been formed, they must dry for 24–48 hours before use.

Seed bombing
Seed bombing is the practice of introducing vegetation to land by throwing or dropping seed balls. It is used in modern aerial seeding as a way to deter seed predation. It has also been popularized by green movements such as guerrilla gardening as a way to introduce new plants to an environment.

Guerrilla gardening
The term "seed green-aide" was first used by Liz Christy in 1973 when she started the Green Guerillas. The first seed green-aides were made from condoms filled with tomato seeds, and fertilizer. They were tossed over fences onto empty lots in New York City in order to make the neighborhoods look better. It was the start of the guerrilla gardening movement.

See also
 The One-Straw Revolution
Miss Rumphius by Barbara Cooney, a 1982 children's book emphasizing public seed scattering
 Seed dispersal
 Johnny Appleseed
 Operation Overgrow
 Diggers

References

Further reading
Smith, K. (2007). The guerilla art kit. Princeton Architectural Press.
Huxta, B. (2009). Garden-variety graffiti. Organic gardening, 2009.

External links

  "What's a clay ball?" and "Clay Ball Method" advice derived directly from Fukuoka Masanobu by The RainMaker Project, a major project in Africa by Yokohama Art Project, Japanese NGO.
  Masanobu Fukuoka's patent for advanced seedballs
  Making Seed Balls, by Jim Bones, he learned personally from Fukuoka Masanobu and from his books.
 </ref> The Seed Ball Story, a video by Jim Bones about desert habitat restoration using seed balls in Big Bend National Park, Texas.
  The entire "Lost Seed Ball Pages" by Jim Bones, An early overview of seed ball production and uses, including instructions for making a von Bachmayr Rotary Drum.
 "Seed Balls R Us" A crossroads website dedicated to sharing seed ball information links and videos.
  "Seed Balls by Masanobu Fukuoka 1997" YouTube 18:43 long video, caption: "Natural Farmer Masanobu Fukuoka conducts a workshop for making seed balls at his natural farm and forest in Japan."
 Making Hay with Clay - Greece
 
  A discussion of the pros and cons of different seed ball recipes
  a website dedicated to seedballs
 
 
  Wikihow.com
 
  Gardenista.com
 Articles.washingtonpost.com
 
 
 
 
 
 
 

Horticultural techniques
Ecological techniques
Organic gardening
Seeds
Reforestation